Vidyarthi is a 1968 Indian Malayalam-language film, directed by J. Sasikumar and produced by K. P. Kottarakkara. The film stars Prem Nazir, Sheela, Jayabharathi and Adoor Bhasi. The film had musical score by B. A. Chidambaranath.

Cast

Prem Nazir
Sheela
Jayabharathi
Adoor Bhasi
Thikkurissy Sukumaran Nair
Muthukulam Raghavan Pillai
Prema
T. R. Omana
Prathapachandran
Aranmula Ponnamma
K. P. Ummer
Kottayam Chellappan
Panjabi

Soundtrack
The music was composed by B. A. Chidambaranath and the lyrics were written by Vayalar Ramavarma.

References

External links
 

1968 films
1960s Malayalam-language films